

Events

Pre-1600
 685 BC – Spring and Autumn period: Battle of Qianshi: Upon the death of the previous Duke of Qi, Gongsun Wuzhi, Duke Zhuang of Lu sends an army into the Duchy of Qi to install the exiled Qi prince Gongzi Jiu as the new Duke of Qi — but is defeated at Qianshi by Jiu’s brother and rival claimant, the newly inaugurated Duke Huan of Qi.
 870 – Treaty of Meerssen: King Louis the German and his half-brother Charles the Bald partition the Middle Frankish Kingdom into two larger east and west divisions.
1220 – Sweden is defeated by Estonian tribes in the Battle of Lihula.
1264 – Mudéjar revolt: Muslim rebel forces took the Alcázar of Jerez de la Frontera after defeating the Castilian garrison.
1503 – King James IV of Scotland marries Margaret Tudor, daughter of King Henry VII of England at Holyrood Abbey in Edinburgh, Scotland.
1509 – Krishnadeva Raya is crowned Emperor of Vijayanagara at Chittoor.
1576 – The cornerstone for Tycho Brahe's Uraniborg observatory is laid on the island of Hven.
1585 – John Davis enters Cumberland Sound in search of the Northwest Passage.
1588 – Anglo-Spanish War: Battle of Gravelines: The naval engagement ends, ending the Spanish Armada's attempt to invade England.

1601–1900
1647 – The Irish Confederate Wars and Wars of the Three Kingdoms: Battle of Dungan's Hill: English Parliamentary forces defeat Irish forces.
1648 – Mehmed IV (1648–1687) succeeds Ibrahim I (1640–1648) as Ottoman sultan.
1709 – Bartolomeu de Gusmão demonstrates the lifting power of hot air in an audience before the king of Portugal in Lisbon, Portugal.
1786 – Mont Blanc on the French-Italian border is climbed for the first time by Jacques Balmat and Dr. Michel-Gabriel Paccard.
1794 – Joseph Whidbey leads an expedition to search for the Northwest Passage near Juneau, Alaska.
1831 – Four hundred Shawnee people agree to relinquish their lands in Ohio in exchange for land west of the Mississippi River in the Treaty of Wapakoneta.
1844 – The Quorum of the Twelve Apostles, headed by Brigham Young, is reaffirmed as the leading body of the Church of Jesus Christ of Latter-day Saints (LDS Church).
1863 – American Civil War: Following his defeat in the Battle of Gettysburg, General Robert E. Lee sends a letter of resignation to Confederate President Jefferson Davis (which is refused upon receipt).
  1863   – Tennessee Military Governor Andrew Johnson frees his personal slaves in Greeneville, Tennessee despite them being exempt from the Emancipation Proclamation, now commemorated as Emancipation Day in the state.
1870 – The Republic of Ploiești, a failed Radical-Liberal rising against Domnitor Carol of Romania.
1876 – Thomas Edison receives a patent for his mimeograph.

1901–present
1903 – Black Saturday occurs, killing 12 in a stadium collapse in Philadelphia.
1908 – Wilbur Wright makes his first flight at a racecourse at Le Mans, France. It is the Wright Brothers' first public flight.
1918 – World War I: The Battle of Amiens begins a string of almost continuous Allied victories with a push through the German front lines (Hundred Days Offensive).
1919 – The Anglo-Afghan Treaty of 1919 is signed. It establishes peaceful relations between Afghanistan and the UK, and confirms the Durand line as the mutual border. In return, the UK is no longer obligated to subsidize the Afghan government.
1929 – The German airship Graf Zeppelin begins a round-the-world flight.
1940 – The "Aufbau Ost" directive is signed by Wilhelm Keitel.
1942 – Quit India Movement is launched in India against the British rule in response to Mohandas Gandhi's call for swaraj or complete independence.
1945 – The London Charter is signed by France, the United Kingdom, the Soviet Union and the United States, establishing the laws and procedures for the Nuremberg trials.   
1946 – First flight of the Convair B-36, the world's first mass-produced nuclear weapon delivery vehicle, the heaviest mass-produced piston-engined aircraft, with the longest wingspan of any military aircraft, and the first bomber with intercontinental range.
1963 – Great Train Robbery: In England, a gang of 15 train robbers steal £2.6 million in bank notes.
  1963   – The Zimbabwe African National Union (ZANU), the current ruling party of Zimbabwe, is formed by a split from the Zimbabwe African People's Union.
1967 – The Association of Southeast Asian Nations (ASEAN) is founded by Indonesia, Malaysia, the Philippines, Singapore and Thailand.
1969 – At a zebra crossing in London, photographer Iain Macmillan takes the iconic photo that becomes the cover image of the Beatles' album Abbey Road.
1973 – Kim Dae-jung, a South Korean politician and later president of South Korea, is kidnapped.
1974 – President Richard Nixon, in a nationwide television address, announces his resignation from the office of the President of the United States effective noon the next day.
1988 – The 8888 Uprising begins in Rangoon (Yangon), Burma (Myanmar). Led by students, hundreds of thousands join in nationwide protests against the one-party regime. On September 18, the demonstrations end in a military crackdown, killing thousands.
  1988   – The first night baseball game in the history of Chicago's Wrigley Field (game was rained out in the fourth inning).
1989 – Space Shuttle program: STS-28 Mission: Space Shuttle Columbia takes off on a secret five-day military mission.
1990 – Iraq occupies Kuwait and the state is annexed to Iraq. This would lead to the Gulf War shortly afterward.
1991 – The Warsaw radio mast, then the tallest construction ever built, collapses.
1993 – The 7.8  Guam earthquake shakes the island with a maximum Mercalli intensity of IX (Violent), causing around $250 million in damage and injuring up to 71 people.
1998 – Iranian consulate in Mazar-i-Sharif, Afghanistan is raided by Taliban leading to the deaths of ten Iranian diplomats and a journalist.
2000 – Confederate submarine H.L. Hunley is raised to the surface after 136 years on the ocean floor and 30 years after its discovery by undersea explorer E. Lee Spence.
2001 – Albanian rebels ambush a convoy of the Army of the Republic of Macedonia near Tetovo, killing 10 soldiers.
2004 – A tour bus belonging to the Dave Matthews Band dumps approximately 800 pounds of human waste onto a boat full of passengers.
2007 – An EF2 tornado touches down in Kings County and Richmond County, New York, the most powerful tornado in New York to date and the first in Brooklyn since 1889.
2008 – A EuroCity express train en route from Kraków, Poland to Prague, Czech Republic strikes a part of a motorway bridge that had fallen onto the railroad track near Studénka railway station in the Czech Republic and derails, killing eight people and injuring 64 others. 
  2008   – The 29th modern summer Olympic Games took place in Beijing, China until August 24. 
2010 – China Floods: A mudslide in Zhugqu County, Gansu, China, kills more than 1,400 people.
2013 – A suicide bombing at a funeral in the Pakistani city of Quetta kills at least 31 people.
2015 – Eight people are killed in a shooting in Harris County, Texas.
2016 – Terrorists attack a government hospital in Quetta, Pakistan with a suicide blast and shooting, killing between 70 and 94 people, and injuring around 130 others.
2022 – The Federal Bureau of Investigation (FBI) executes a raid on former president Donald Trump's residence in Mar-a-Lago, Palm Beach, Florida.

Births

Pre-1600
 422 – Casper, ruler of the Maya city of Palenque
1079 – Emperor Horikawa of Japan (d. 1107)
1170 – Saint Dominic, founder of the Dominicans (d. 1221)
1306 – Rudolf II, Duke of Bavaria (d. 1353)
1492 – Matteo Tafuri, Italian alchemist (d. 1582)
1518 – Conrad Lycosthenes, French-German scholar and author (d. 1561)
1558 – George Clifford, 3rd Earl of Cumberland, English noble (d. 1605)

1601–1900
1605 – Cecil Calvert, 2nd Baron Baltimore, English lawyer and politician, Governor of Newfoundland (d. 1675)
1640 – Amalia Catharina, German poet and composer (d. 1697)
1646 – Godfrey Kneller, German-English painter (d. 1723)
1673 – John Ker, Scottish spy (d. 1726)
1693 – Laurent Belissen, French composer (d. 1762)
1694 – Francis Hutcheson, Irish philosopher and academic (d. 1746)
1709 – Hermann Anton Gelinek, German-Italian monk and violinist (d. 1779)
1720 – Carl Fredrik Pechlin, Swedish general and politician (d. 1796)
1754 – Hipólito Ruiz López, Spanish botanist (d. 1816)
1758 – Friedrich Georg Weitsch, German painter (d. 1828)
1790 – Ferenc Kölcsey, Hungarian poet, critic, and politician (d. 1838)
1807 – Emilie Flygare-Carlén, Swedish author (d. 1892)
1814 – Esther Hobart Morris, American suffragette and judge (d. 1902)
1822 – George Stoneman, Jr., United States Army cavalry officer (d. 1894)
1839 – Nelson A. Miles, American general (d. 1925)
1851 – George Turner, Australian politician, 18th Premier of Victoria (d. 1916)
1856 – Thomas Anstey Guthrie, English journalist and author (d. 1934)
1857 – Cécile Chaminade, French pianist and composer (d. 1944)
1863 – Jean Leon Gerome Ferris, American painter (d. 1930)
1866 – Matthew Henson, American explorer (d. 1955)
1874 – Albert Stanley, 1st Baron Ashfield, English businessman and politician, President of the Board of Trade (d. 1948)
1875 – Arthur Bernardes, Brazilian lawyer and politician, 12th President of Brazil (d. 1955)
1876 – Varghese Payyappilly Palakkappilly, Indian-Syrian priest, founded the Sisters of the Destitute (d. 1929)
1879 – Bob Smith, American physician and surgeon, co-founded Alcoholics Anonymous (d. 1950)
  1879   – Emiliano Zapata, Mexican general and politician (d. 1919)
1880 – Earle Page, Australian lawyer, academic, and politician, 11th Prime Minister of Australia (d. 1961)
1881 – Paul Ludwig Ewald von Kleist, German field marshal (d. 1954)
1882 – Ladislas Starevich, Russian-French animator, screenwriter, and cinematographer (d. 1965)
1884 – Sara Teasdale, American poet and educator (d. 1933)
1889 – Hans Egede Budtz, Danish actor (d. 1968)
  1889   – Jack Ryder, Australian cricketer (d. 1977)
1891 – Adolf Busch, German violinist and composer (d. 1952)
1896 – Marjorie Kinnan Rawlings, American author and academic (d. 1953)
1898 – Marguerite Bise, French chef (d. 1965)

1901–present
1901 – Ernest Lawrence, American physicist and academic, Nobel Prize laureate (d. 1958)
1902 – Paul Dirac, English-American physicist and academic, Nobel Prize laureate (d. 1984)
1904 – Achille Varzi, Italian racing driver (d. 1948)
1905 – André Jolivet, French composer (d. 1974)
1907 – Benny Carter, American saxophonist, trumpet player, and composer (d. 2003)
1908 – Arthur Goldberg, American jurist and politician, 6th United States Ambassador to the United Nations (d. 1990)
1909 – Charles Lyttelton, 10th Viscount Cobham, English cricketer and politician, 9th Governor-General of New Zealand (d. 1977)
  1909   – Jack Renshaw, Australian politician, 31st Premier of New South Wales (d. 1987)
  1909   – Bill Voce, England cricketer and coach (d. 1984)
1910 – Jimmy Murphy, Welsh-English footballer and manager (d. 1989)
  1910   – Sylvia Sidney, American actress (d. 1999)
1911 – Rosetta LeNoire, American actress (d. 2002)
1915 – James Elliott, American runner and coach (d. 1981)
1919 – Dino De Laurentiis, Italian actor and producer (d. 2010)
  1919   – John David Wilson, English animator and producer (d. 2013)
1920 – Leo Chiosso, Italian songwriter and producer (d. 2006)
  1920   – Jimmy Witherspoon, American jump blues singer (d. 1997)
1921 – William Asher, American director, producer, and screenwriter (d. 2012)
  1921   – Webb Pierce, American singer-songwriter and guitarist (d. 1991)
  1921   – Esther Williams, American swimmer and actress (d. 2013)
1922 – Rory Calhoun, American actor (d. 1999)
  1922   – Rudi Gernreich, Austrian-American fashion designer, created the Monokini (d. 1985)
  1922   – Gertrude Himmelfarb, American historian, author, and academic (d. 2019)
  1922   – Károly Reich, Hungarian illustrator (d. 1988)
1925 – Alija Izetbegović, Bosnian lawyer and politician, 1st President of Bosnia and Herzegovina (d. 2003)
  1925   – Aziz Sattar, Malaysian actor, comedian, singer and director (d. 2014)
1926 – Richard Anderson, American actor and producer (d. 2017)
1927 – Johnny Temple, American baseball player and coach (d. 1994)
  1927   – Maia Wojciechowska, Polish-American author (d. 2002)
1928 – Don Burrows, Australian saxophonist, clarinet player, and flute player (d. 2020)
1929 – Larisa Bogoraz, Russian linguist and activist (d. 2004)
  1929   – Luis García Meza Tejada, Bolivian general and politician, 68th President of Bolivia (d. 2018)
1930 – Terry Nation, Welsh-American author and screenwriter (d. 1997)
  1930   – Jerry Tarkanian, American basketball player and coach (d. 2015)
1931 – Roger Penrose, English physicist, mathematician, and philosopher, Nobel Prize laureate
1932 – Mel Tillis, American singer-songwriter and guitarist (d. 2017)
1933 – Joe Tex, American soul singer-songwriter (d. 1982)
1934 – Sarat Pujari, Indian actor, director, and screenwriter (d. 2014)
1935 – Donald P. Bellisario, American director, producer, and screenwriter
  1935   – John Laws, Papua New Guinean-Australian singer and radio host
1936 – Frank Howard, American baseball player and manager
  1936   – Jan Pieńkowski, Polish-English author and illustrator (d. 2022)
1937 – Dustin Hoffman, American actor and director
  1937   – Sheila Varian, American horse breeder (d. 2016)
  1937   – Cornelis Vreeswijk, Dutch-Swedish singer-songwriter, guitarist, and actor (d. 1987)
1938 – Jack Baldwin, English chemist and academic (d. 2020)
  1938   – Jacques Hétu, Canadian composer and educator (d. 2010)
  1938   – Connie Stevens, American actress and businesswoman 
1939 – Jana Andrsová, Czech actress and ballerina
  1939   – Viorica Viscopoleanu, Romanian long jumper
  1939   – Alexander Watson, American diplomat, United States Ambassador to Peru
1940 – Dilip Sardesai, Indian cricketer (d. 2007)
  1940   – Dennis Tito, American engineer and businessman, founded Wilshire Associates
1942 – James Blanchard, American diplomat and politician, 45th Governor of Michigan
  1942   – Dennis Canavan, Scottish educator and politician
  1942   – John Gustafson, English singer-songwriter and bass player (d. 2014)
  1942   – Vardo Rumessen, Estonian pianist and musicologist (d. 2015)
1944 – John C. Holmes, American film actor (d. 1988)
  1944   – Michael Johnson, American singer-songwriter, guitarist, and producer (d. 2017)
  1944   – John Renbourn, English-Scottish guitarist and songwriter (d. 2015)
  1944   – Simon Taylor, English journalist and author
1946 – Joe Bethancourt, American singer-songwriter (d. 2014)
1947 – Ken Dryden, Canadian ice hockey player, lawyer, and politician
  1947   – Larry Wilcox, American actor, director, and producer
1948 – Svetlana Savitskaya, Russian engineer and astronaut
  1948   – Margaret Urban Walker, American philosopher
1949 – Terry Burnham, American actress
  1949   – Keith Carradine, American actor 
  1949   – Ricardo Londoño, Colombian racing driver (d. 2009)
1950 – Willie Hall, American drummer and producer 
  1950   – Ken Kutaragi, Japanese businessman, created PlayStation
1951 – Martin Brest, American director, producer, and screenwriter
  1951   – Phil Carlson, Australian cricketer (d. 2022)
  1951   – Mohamed Morsi, Egyptian engineer, academic, and politician, 5th President of Egypt (d. 2019)
  1951   – Mamoru Oshii, Japanese director, producer, and screenwriter
  1951   – Randy Shilts, American journalist and author (d. 1994)
  1951   – Louis van Gaal, Dutch footballer and manager
1952 – Anton Fig, South African-American drummer 
  1952   – Jostein Gaarder, Norwegian author
  1952   – Doug Melvin, Canadian baseball player and manager
  1952   – Robin Quivers, American nurse, radio host/personality, and author  
  1952   – Sudhakar Rao, Indian cricketer
1953 – Nigel Mansell, English racing driver
1954 – Nick Holtam, English bishop
1955 – Diddú, Icelandic singer-songwriter
  1955   – Herbert Prohaska, Austrian footballer and manager
  1955   – Michael Roe, Irish racing driver
1956 – Chris Foreman, English singer-songwriter and guitarist 
  1956   – David Grant, English singer 
  1956   – Cecilia Roth, Argentinian actress
1957 – Dennis Drew, American keyboard player 
1958 – Deborah Norville, American journalist
1959 – Caroline Ansink, Dutch flute player, composer, and educator
1960 – Mustafa Balbay, Turkish journalist and politician
  1960   – Ulrich Maly, German politician, 16th Mayor of Nuremberg
1961 – The Edge, British-Irish musician, singer and songwriter
  1961   – Daniel House, American bass player and producer 
  1961   – Ron Klain, American lawyer and politician, White House Chief of Staff
  1961   – Bruce Matthews, American football player and coach
  1961   – Rikki Rockett, American glam rock drummer
1962 – Kool Moe Dee, American musician, singer and actor
1963 – Hur Jin-ho, South Korean director and screenwriter
  1963   – Ron Karkovice, American baseball player and manager
  1963   – Emi Shinohara, Japanese voice actress and singer
  1963   – Jon Turteltaub, American director and producer
  1963   – Stephen Walkom, Canadian ice hockey player, referee, and manager
1964 – Anastasia M. Ashman, American blogger and author
  1964   – Giuseppe Conte, Prime Minister of Italy
  1964   – Scott Sandelin, American ice hockey player and coach
  1964   – Paul Taylor, English cricketer
1965 – Angus Fraser, English cricketer, manager, and journalist
  1965   – Kate Langbroek, Australian talk show host
1966 – Chris Eubank, English boxer
  1966   – John Hudek, American baseball player and coach
1967 – Marcelo Balboa, American soccer player, coach, and sportscaster
1968 – Yvie Burnett, Scottish soprano
  1968   – Aldo Calderón van Dyke, Honduran journalist (d. 2013)
  1968   – Abey Kuruvilla, Indian cricketer and coach
  1968   – Huey Morgan, American singer-songwriter and guitarist 
1969 – Monika Tsõganova, Estonian chess player
  1969   – Faye Wong, Chinese singer-songwriter and actress
1970 – Trev Alberts, American football player and journalist
  1970   – Ben G. Davis, English chemist and academic
  1970   – José Francisco Molina, Spanish footballer and manager
  1970   – Chester Williams, South African rugby player and coach (d. 2019)
1971 – Johnny Balentina, Dutch baseball player
1972 – Joely Collins, Canadian actress and producer
  1972   – Andrea de Rossi, Italian rugby player and coach
  1972   – Axel Merckx, Belgian cyclist
  1972   – Steven Tweed, Scottish footballer and manager
1973 – Shane Lee, Australian cricketer and guitarist 
  1973   – Gert Olesk, Estonian footballer and manager
  1973   – Scott Stapp, American singer-songwriter and producer
  1973   – Mark Wills, American singer-songwriter
  1973   – Ilka Agricola, German mathematician
1974 – Manjul Bhargava, Canadian-American mathematician and academic
  1974   – Scott D'Amore, Canadian wrestler and manager
  1974   – Brian Harvey, English singer-songwriter 
  1974   – Andy Priaulx, Guernseyan racing driver
1975 – Mick Moss, English singer-songwriter 
1976 – JC Chasez, American singer and dancer
  1976   – Drew Lachey, American singer and actor 
1977 – Lindsay Sloane, American actress
  1977   – Darren Manzella, American sergeant (d. 2013)
  1977   – Rocky Thompson, Canadian ice hockey player and coach
  1977   – Nicolas Vogondy, French cyclist
  1977   – Mohammad Wasim, Pakistani cricketer
1978 – Alan Maybury, Irish footballer and coach
  1978   – Louis Saha, French footballer
  1978   – Miho Shiraishi, Japanese actress
1979 – Richard Harwood, English cellist
  1979   – Rashard Lewis, American basketball player
  1979   – Richard Lyons, Northern Irish racing driver
1980 – Craig Breslow, American baseball player
  1980   – Jack Cassel, American baseball player
  1980   – Denisse Guerrero, Mexican singer-songwriter 
  1980   – Mike Hindert, American singer and bass player 
  1980   – Sabine Klaschka, German tennis player
  1980   – Diego Markwell, Dutch baseball player
  1980   – Pat Noonan, American soccer player
  1980   – Michael Urie, American actor, director, and producer
1981 – Vanessa Amorosi, Australian singer-songwriter
  1981   – Roger Federer, Swiss tennis player
  1981   – Meagan Good, American actress and producer
  1981   – Harel Skaat, Israeli singer-songwriter
1982 – David Florence, English canoe racer
  1982   – Ross Ohlendorf, American baseball player
1983 – Guy Burnet, English actor and producer
  1983   – Willie Tonga, Australian rugby league player
1984 – Kirk Broadfoot, Scottish footballer
  1984   – Norbert Michelisz, Hungarian racing driver
  1984   – Martrez Milner, American football player
1985 – Toby Flood, English rugby player
  1985   – Ryan Koolwijk, Dutch footballer
  1985   – James Morgan, Welsh actor and producer
  1985   – Brett Ratliff, American football player
  1985   – Anita Włodarczyk, Polish track and field athlete
1986 – Kateryna Bondarenko, Ukrainian tennis player
  1986   – Pierre Garçon, American football player
  1986   – Chris Pressley, American football player
1987 – Pierre Boulanger, French actor
  1987   – Katie Leung, Scottish actress
  1987   – Tatjana Maria, German tennis player
1988 – Princess Beatrice, Mrs Edoardo Mapelli Mozzi, British Princess
  1988   – Danilo Gallinari, Italian basketball player
  1988   – Rinku Singh, Indian baseball player
  1988   – Laura Slade Wiggins, American actress and singer  
1989 – Ken Baumann, American actor and author
  1989   – Anthony Rizzo, American baseball player
  1989   – Hannah Miley, English-Scottish swimmer
  1989   – Prajakta Mali, Indian actress
1990 – Vladimír Darida, Czech footballer
  1990   – Parker Kligerman, American race car driver
  1990   – Aleksandra Szwed, Polish actress and singer
  1990   – Kane Williamson, New Zealand cricket captain
1991 – Nélson Oliveira, Portuguese footballer
  1991   – Tyrone Peachey, Australian rugby league player
1992 – Josip Drmić, Swiss footballer
  1992   – Casey Cott, American actor
1998 – Shawn Mendes, Canadian singer-songwriter and guitarist
  1998   – Ryan Garcia, American boxer
2000 – Félix Auger-Aliassime, Canadian tennis player

Deaths

Pre-1600
117 – Trajan, Roman emperor (b. 53)
 753 – Hildegar, bishop of  Cologne
 869 – Lothair II, Frankish king (b. 835)
 998 – Seo Hui, Korean politician and diplomat (b. 942)
1002 – Almanzor, chief minister and de facto ruler of Córdoba
1171 – Henry of Blois, bishop of Winchester (b. 1111)
1303 – Henry of Castile the Senator, Spanish nobleman (b. 1230)
1533 – Lucas van Leyden, Dutch artist (b. 1494)
1555 – Oronce Finé, French mathematician and cartographer (b. 1494)
1588 – Alonso Sánchez Coello, Spanish painter (b. 1532)

1601–1900
1604 – Horio Tadauji, Japanese daimyō (b. 1578)
1616 – Cornelis Ketel, Dutch painter (b. 1548)
1631 – Konstantinas Sirvydas, Lithuanian priest, lexicographer, and academic (b. 1579)
1684 – George Booth, 1st Baron Delamer, English politician (b. 1622)
1724 – Christoph Ludwig Agricola, German painter (b. 1665)
1747 – Madeleine de Verchères, Canadian raid leader (b. 1678)
1746 – Francis Hutcheson, Irish philosopher (b. 1694)
1759 – Carl Heinrich Graun, German tenor and composer (b. 1704)
1827 – George Canning, English lawyer and politician, Prime Minister of the United Kingdom (b. 1770)
1828 – Carl Peter Thunberg, Swedish botanist and psychologist (b. 1743)
1858 – Marie-Claire Heureuse Félicité Bonheur, Haitian Empress (b. 1758)
1863 – Angus MacAskill, Scottish-Canadian giant (b. 1825)
1879 – Immanuel Hermann Fichte, German philosopher and academic (b. 1797)
1887 – Alexander William Doniphan, American colonel, lawyer, and politician (b. 1808)
1897 – Jacob Burckhardt, Swiss historian and academic (b. 1818)
1898 – Eugène Boudin, French painter (b. 1824)

1901–present
1902 – James Tissot, French painter and illustrator (b. 1836)
  1902   – John Henry Twachtman, American painter and academic (b. 1853)
1909 – Mary MacKillop, Australian nun and saint, co-founded the Sisters of St Joseph of the Sacred Heart (b. 1842)
1911 – William P. Frye, American lawyer and politician (b. 1830)
1920 – Eduard Birnbaum, Polish-born German cantor (b. 1855)
1921 – Juhani Aho, Finnish journalist and author (b. 1861)
1928 – Stjepan Radić, Croatian politician (b. 1871)
1930 – Launceston Elliot, Scottish wrestler and weightlifter (b. 1874)
1934 – Wilbert Robinson, American baseball player, coach, and manager (b. 1863)
1937 – Jimmie Guthrie, Scottish motorcycle racer (b. 1897)
1940 – Johnny Dodds, American clarinet player and saxophonist (b. 1892)
1944 – Erwin von Witzleben, German field marshal (b. 1881)
  1944   – Michael Wittmann, German commander (b. 1914)
1950 – Fergus McMaster, Australian businessman, founded Qantas (b. 1879)
1959 – Albert Namatjira, Australian painter (b. 1902)
1965 – Shirley Jackson, American novelist and short story writer (b. 1916)
1969 – Otmar Freiherr von Verschuer, German biologist and eugenicist (b. 1896)
1971 – Freddie Spencer Chapman, English lieutenant (b. 1907)
1973 – Vilhelm Moberg, Swedish historian and author (b. 1898)
1974 – Elisabeth Abegg, German anti-Nazi resistance fighter (b. 1882)
1975 – Cannonball Adderley, American saxophonist (b. 1928)
1979 – Nicholas Monsarrat, English lieutenant and author (b. 1910)
1980 – Paul Triquet, Canadian general, Victoria Cross recipient (b. 1910)
1981 – Thomas McElwee, Irish republican and PIRA volunteer (b. 1957)
1982 – Eric Brandon, English racing driver and businessman (b. 1920)
1984 – Richard Deacon, American actor (b. 1921)
  1984   – Ellen Raskin, American author and illustrator (b. 1928)
1985 – Louise Brooks, American actress (b. 1906)
1987 – Danilo Blanuša, Croatian mathematician and physicist (b. 1903)
1988 – Félix Leclerc, Canadian singer-songwriter and guitarist (b. 1914)
  1988   – Alan Napier, English actor (b. 1903)
1991 – James Irwin, American colonel, pilot, and astronaut (b. 1930)
1992 – Abu al-Qasim al-Khoei, Iranian religious leader and scholar (b. 1899)
1996 – Nevill Francis Mott, English physicist and academic, Nobel Prize laureate (b. 1905)
  1996   – Jüri Randviir, Estonian chess player and journalist (b. 1927)
1998 – Mahmoud Saremi, Iranian journalist (b. 1968)
2003 – Dirk Hoogendam, Dutch-German SS officer (b. 1922)
  2003   – Falaba Issa Traoré, Malian director and playwright (b. 1930)
2004 – Leon Golub, American painter and academic (b. 1922)
  2004   – Fay Wray, Canadian-American actress (b. 1907)
2005 – Barbara Bel Geddes, American actress (b. 1922)
  2005   – Ahmed Deedat, South African missionary and author (b. 1918)
  2005   – John H. Johnson, American publisher, founded the Johnson Publishing Company (b. 1918)
  2005   – Gene Mauch, American baseball player and manager (b. 1925)
  2005   – Dean Rockwell, American commander, wrestler, and coach (b. 1912)
  2005   – Monica Sjöö, Swedish-English painter (b. 1938)
2007 – Ma Lik, Chinese journalist and politician (b. 1952)
  2007   – Melville Shavelson, American director, producer, and screenwriter (b. 1917)
2008 – Orville Moody, American golfer (b. 1933)
2009 – Daniel Jarque, Spanish footballer (b. 1983)
2010 – Patricia Neal, American actress (b. 1926)
2012 – Fay Ajzenberg-Selove, German-American physicist and academic (b. 1926)
  2012   – Ruth Etchells, English poet and academic (b. 1931)
  2012   – Surya Lesmana, Indonesian footballer and manager (b. 1944)
  2012   – Kurt Maetzig, German director and screenwriter (b. 1911)
2013 – Karen Black, American actress (b. 1939)
  2013   – Johannes Bluyssen, Dutch bishop (b. 1926)
  2013   – Fernando Castro Pacheco, Mexican painter, engraver, and illustrator (b. 1918)
  2013   – Igor Kurnosov, Russian chess player (b. 1985)
  2013   – Regina Resnik, American soprano and actress (b. 1922)
2014 – Menahem Golan, Israeli director and producer (b. 1929)
  2014   – Charles Keating, English-American actor (b. 1941)
  2014   – Leonardo Legaspi, Filipino archbishop (b. 1935)
  2014   – Peter Sculthorpe, Australian composer and conductor (b. 1929)
  2014   – Red Wilson, American football and baseball player (b. 1929)
2015 – Sean Price, American rapper (b. 1972)
  2015   – Gus Mortson, Canadian ice hockey player and coach (b. 1925)
2017 – Glen Campbell, American singer-songwriter, guitarist, and actor (b. 1936)
2018 – Nicholas Bett, Kenyan track and field athlete (b. 1990) 
2020 – Gabriel Ochoa Uribe, Colombian football player and manager (b. 1929)
  2020   – Alfredo Lim, former Philippine senator and Mayor of Manila (b. 1929)
2021 – Bill Davis, Canadian politician, 18th premier of Ontario (b. 1929)
2022 – Olivia Newton-John, English-Australian singer-songwriter and actress (b. 1948)

Holidays and observances
 Ceasefire Day (end of Iran–Iraq War) (Iraqi Kurdistan)
Christian Feast Day:
 Altmann of Passau
 Cyriacus
 Dominic de Guzmán, founder of the Dominican Order.
 Four Crowned Martyrs
 Largus
 Mary MacKillop
 Saint Smaragdus (and companions)
 Severus of Vienne
 August 8 (Eastern Orthodox liturgics)
 Father's Day or Bā bā Day (爸爸節), Bā Bā is Mandarin for "father" and "8-8", or August 8. (Mongolia, Taiwan)
 Happiness Happens Day 
 International Cat Day 
 Namesday of the Queen (Sweden)
 Nane Nane Day (Tanzania) 
 Signal Troops Day (Ukraine)

References

External links

 
 
 

Days of the year
August